The United Kingdom has an embassy in Montevideo. Uruguay has an embassy in London.

Country comparison

History

Both countries established diplomatic relations immediately after Uruguay's independence in 1825. Paramount to Uruguay's constitution as a state was the Preliminary Peace Convention of 1828, a piece of British diplomacy.

The UK played an important role in Uruguay's history until the end of World War II, after which the United States played an increasing role.

See also 
 British Uruguayan
 Foreign relations of the United Kingdom
 Foreign relations of Uruguay
 Uruguayans in the United Kingdom

External links

 British Foreign and Commonwealth Office about the relation with Uruguay
 British embassy in Montevideo
 British Council Uruguay

References

 

 
Uruguay
Bilateral relations of Uruguay